The Fun of Open Discussion is a bluegrass album by American musician John Hartford and Bob Carlin, released in 1995 (see 1995 in music).

As a member of the Hartford String Band, Carlin contributed to a number of Hartford's albums.

The liner notes detail the origin of each song.

Track listing
 "Big John McNeil" (J. Scott Skinner) – 3:07
 "The Fun of Open Discussion" (John Hartford) – 2:53
 "Jenny on the Railroad" (Traditional) – 3:22
 "Hy Patitian" (Traditional) – 2:34
 "Tishomingo County Blues" (John Hatcher) – 2:11
 "Lantern in the Ditch" (John Henry Jones) – 3:33
 "Greenback Dollar	" (Traditional) – 4:16
 "M.I.S.I.P." (Hartford) – 3:17
 "Doc Chapman's Breakdown" (Owen "Snake" Chapman) – 3:37
 "Chinquapin" (Carroll Best) – 3:10
 "Bull at the Wagon" (Denmon Lewis, Dempson Lewis) – 3:01
 "Mrs. Maxwell" (Turlough O'Carolan) – 3:04
 "Indian War Whoop" (Hoyt "Floyd" Ming) – 2:45
 "Shortenin' Bread" (Dock Philipine Roberts) – 5:24
 "Dry and Dusty" (Traditional) – 3:11
 "Kitty Puss" (Traditional) – 3:53

Personnel
John Hartford – vocals, fiddle
Bob Carlin – banjo

References

External links
LP Discography of John Hartford.

John Hartford albums
1995 albums